Rule Britannia may refer to:
Rule, Britannia!, a British patriotic song
Rule Britannia (novel), by Daphne du Maurier (1972)
Rule Britannia (TV series), a documentary series 2009–2015

See also
 Britannia (disambiguation)
 "Cool Britannia", a song on Gorilla (Bonzo Dog Doo-Dah Band album) of 1967
 Cool Britannia, a term applied to some aspects of British popular culture in the 1990s
 Fool Britannia, a hidden camera sketch series on British TV network ITV, premiered in 2012
 "Rue Britannia", a 196061 story arc in the animated TV series Rocky and His Friends
 Ruled Britannia, an alternate history novel from 2002 by Harry Turtledove